Hrbáček or Hrbacek is a surname. Notable people with the surname include:

Dean A. Hrbacek, American lawyer and politician
Jaroslav Hrbáček (1921–2010), Czech hydrobiologist
Karel Hrbacek, mathematician

Czech-language surnames